Poipū (literally, "crashing waves" in Hawaiian) is a census-designated place (CDP) in Kauai County on the southern side of the island of Kauai in the U.S. state of Hawaii. The population was 1,299 at the 2020 census. The town features a group of high-end hotels, resorts and two main shopping centers. Po’ipū is a very touristy spot and is home to huge resorts like the Grand Hyatt.

Geography
Poipū is located at  (21.884079, -159.464195). It is bordered to the north by Koloa and to the south by the Pacific Ocean.

Demographics

As of the census of 2000, there were 1,075 people, 472 households, and 311 families residing in the CDP. The racial makeup of the CDP was 69.4% White, 0.1% African American, 0.4% Native American, 16.9% Asian, 2.0% Pacific Islander, 0.7% from other races, and 10.5% from two or more races. Hispanic or Latino of any race were 4.2% of the population.

There were 473 households, out of which 18.6% had children under the age of 18 living with them, 57.4% were married couples living together, 5.3% had a female householder with no husband present, and 34.1% were non-families. 24.6% of all households were made up of individuals, and 7.4% had someone living alone who was 65 years of age or older.  The average household size was 2.28 and the average family size was 2.65.

In the CDP the population was spread out, with 16.3% under the age of 18, 3.3% from 18 to 24, 23.0% from 25 to 44, 37.0% from 45 to 64, and 20.5% who were 65 years of age or older.  The median age was 49 years. For every 100 females, there were 94.7 males.  For every 100 females age 18 and over, there were 96.1 males.

The median income for a household in the CDP was $51,442, and the median income for a family was $62,396. Males had a median income of $40,694 versus $30,625 for females. The per capita income for the CDP was $35,800.  About 2.7% of families and 7.5% of the population were below the poverty line, including 6.0% of those under age 18 and 1.3% of those age 65 or over.

Gallery

Points of interest
 Allerton Garden
 Kaneiolouma Complex
 Moir Gardens
 Mahaulepu Beach
 Makauwahi Cave
 McBryde Garden
 Poipu Beach Park
 Prince Kuhio Park
 Spouting Horn

References

External links

 National Tropical Botanical Garden – two gardens:
 McBryde Garden
 Allerton Garden
 Poipu Beach Resort Association

Census-designated places in Kauai County, Hawaii
Populated places on Kauai
Populated coastal places in Hawaii